Sergio Darío Herrera Month (born 15 March 1981 in Barrancabermeja) is a Colombian retired footballer.

Career
Herrera began his career in 1999 with Alianza Petrolera, but stayed for just one season before moving to play in the Argentine Second Division with Club Almagro. However, he was soon on the move again, going back to Colombia and signing for América de Cali for the start of the 2000 Mustang Cup, which he won with América. He stayed in Cali for three seasons before moving back to the club where he had started, Alianza Petrolera, where he again stayed for only one season before he switched back to América de Cali where he had a successful season, scoring 13 goals in 22 matches.

This sparked the interest of Saudi Premier League side Al Ittihad. However, he struggled to make an impact in Saudi Arabia and transferred to Brazil to play with Atlético Paranaense.

On 5 February 2010, Columbus Crew of MLS signed the Colombian forward from Deportivo Cali on an undisclosed terms.

He was named to the 18-man roster for the Crew's CONCACAF Champions League quarterfinal first leg against Deportivo Toluca of Mexico on 9 March 2010 in Columbus, Ohio, but did not enter the match. Herrera was again an unused substitute for the Black & Gold in the return leg at Deportivo Toluca on 17 March 2010 in Toluca, Mexico.

He was released on 29 June 2010 having played just one league minute for the Crew. This broke the previous club record for fewest career minutes held by Ricci Greenwood with 7, set 14 years earlier during the team's inaugural season. After his release from the Crew, Herrera signed for Venezuelan club Deportivo Táchira.

Honors

América de Cali
Copa Mustang (3): 2000, 2001, 2002

Al-Ittihad
Crown Prince Cup (1):  2004
AFC Champions League (1):  2005

References

External links

1981 births
Living people
Colombian footballers
Association football forwards
Alianza Petrolera players
Club Almagro players
América de Cali footballers
Club Athletico Paranaense players
Ittihad FC players
Deportivo Cali footballers
Columbus Crew players
Deportivo Táchira F.C. players
Deportes Quindío footballers
Once Caldas footballers
Independiente Santa Fe footballers
Colombia international footballers
Expatriate footballers in Brazil
Expatriate footballers in Argentina
Expatriate footballers in Saudi Arabia
Expatriate soccer players in the United States
Expatriate footballers in Venezuela
2004 Copa América players
Categoría Primera A players
Categoría Primera B players
Primera Nacional players
Saudi Professional League players
Major League Soccer players
Venezuelan Primera División players
Sportspeople from Santander Department